Constant Bens (born 26 November 1941) is a Belgian former wrestler who competed in the 1972 Summer Olympics.

References

External links
 

1941 births
Living people
Olympic wrestlers of Belgium
Wrestlers at the 1972 Summer Olympics
Belgian male sport wrestlers